Madiun Station (station code: MN) is a type-A major railway station in Madiun Lor, Mangunharjo, Madiun.  This railway station located in Jalan Kompol Sunaryo 6A at an altitude of +63 m above sea level.

There are branching towards the rail depot owned by Pertamina before entering Madiun Station from the west—after the level crossings at Yos Sudarso Street. In the west of the station, there is a locomotive depot owned by Industri Kereta Api. In the south, there is a railway line which branches will end in Slahung, Ponorogo, but since 1992 the rail has been defunct.

Madiun Station is a one-side station in which the main building is located in line with railway train and emplacement The majority of station building both main building and emplacement has been renovated so that the whole view of this station evokes a modern nuance. At platform room a small remain of the elements of old building can be seen in the form of big dog in square shape. The lower part of the wall is layered with marble to minimize maintenance as it functions as public area.

Services

Passenger services

Executive class
 Bima, destination of  via  and 
 Gajayana, destination of  via  and 
 Brawijaya, destination of  via  and 

Mixed class

Economy class
 Majapahit, destination of  via  and 
 Jayakarta, destination of  via  and 
 Matarmaja, destination of  via  and 

Freight services
  via --
  via --

Gallery

References

External links
 
  

Madiun
Railway stations in East Java